The Miss South Carolina Teen USA pageant is the competition that selects the representatives for the state of South Carolina in the Miss Teen USA pageant. The pageant has been directed by RPM Productions since its inception.

South Carolina is in the top 10 most successful states at Miss Teen USA in terms of number and value of placements, this state has placed 17 times at Miss Teen USA and has produced two winners.  Vanessa Joy Minnillo won the Miss Teen USA title on August 17, 1998 in Shreveport, Louisiana and later went on to become successful in the entertainment industry and Katherine (K.) Lee Graham won the Miss Teen USA title on August 2, 2014 in Nassau, Bahamas.

South Carolina holds the record for the most Miss Congeniality awards. It has won three: 1994, 1998, and 2002. In 1998, Minnillo became the first teenager to win both Miss Congeniality and the national title, and is one of only two contestants to achieve this.

Six Miss South Carolina Teen USA titleholders have won the Miss South Carolina USA title and competed at Miss USA.

Kenlee McVay of Clemson was crowned Miss South Carolina Teen USA 2023 on March 4, 2023 at North Charleston Coliseum & Performing Arts Center in North Charleston. She will represent South Carolina for the title of Miss Teen USA 2023.

Gallery of titleholders

Results summary

Placements
Miss Teen USAs: Vanessa Joy Minnillo (1998), K. Lee Graham (2014)
1st runners-up: Brittany Pjetraj (2008), Tori Sizemore (2013), Kirby Elizabeth Self (2018)
2nd runner-up: Marley Stokes (2016)
3rd runner-up: Caitlin Upton (2007)
Top 6: Mary Stevenson (1994)
Top 12: Lauren Poppell (1993)
Top 15/16: Lindsey Sporrer (2004), Brittany Smith (2006), Keyla Childs (2011), Shannon Ford (2012), Wesley Mitchell (2015), Allie Richardson (2019), Gracen Grainger (2020), Augusta Roach (2021)
South Carolina holds a record of 17 placements at Miss Teen USA.

Awards
Miss Congeniality: Mary Stevenson (1994), Vanessa Joy Minnillo (1998), Austen Brown (2002)

Winners 

Color key

1 Age at the time of the Miss Teen USA pageant

References

External links
Official website

South Carolina
Women in South Carolina